A flag day in Hong Kong is a day on which public fundraising of charities takes place. Organised public fundraising in Hong Kong must be government-approved. Historically, it had been held only on a Saturday. It is currently, however, organised on Wednesdays and Saturdays. Flag-selling hours are from 7:00 in the morning to 12:30 in the afternoon on a flag day.

On a flag day, volunteers with some stock of "flags" and a bag to collect donations (money) stand on streets to raise funds from passers-by. In the past, actual small flags were handed out to people who gave money. Nowadays, people receive a little sticker, which typically bears the name and logo of the beneficiary, to place on their clothing after they donate money. Those stickers for particular use in a flag day are still called "flags", in both English and Cantonese.

Application procedure
Any charitable organisation must obtain a Public Subscription Permit from the Social Welfare Department prior to performing any public fundraising activities.

Governing ordinance
Government approval of flag day activities is enshrined in the Summary Offences Ordinance, Cap. 228 Section 4(17)(i) in the Laws of Hong Kong. It states that any person or organisation that organises, provides equipment for, or participates in any collection of money or sale or exchange for donation of badges, tokens or similar articles in a public place for charitable purpose, should apply for a permit from the Director of Social Welfare.

Applicants
Most approved flags-selling organisations are non-profit organisations.

See also
Flag Day

References

Charity events
Events in Hong Kong